Yeylaq (also Romanized as Yeylāq) is a village in Jargalan Rural District, Raz and Jargalan County, North Khorasan Province, Iran. At the 2006 census, its population was 230, in 40 families.

References 

Populated places in Bojnord County